The Days River is a  river on the Upper Peninsula of the U.S. state of Michigan.

It is a narrow, rocky, and scenic river that supports brook, steelhead and rainbow trout, smelt, and white and longnose suckers in the spring. There is a low-head dam by Gladstone Golf Course installed in 1978 to prevent upstream migration of invasive sea lamprey.

Days River was named for John Day, a trapper and pioneer settler.

References

External links 
TopoQuest topographic map

Rivers of Michigan
Rivers of Delta County, Michigan
Tributaries of Lake Michigan